Russell Edward Jacobus (born September 27, 1944) was the seventh Bishop of the Diocese of Fond du Lac in The Episcopal Church. Jacobus was consecrated as bishop on 24 May 1994. Prior to becoming bishop, he served as Rector of St. Matthias Episcopal Church in Waukesha, Wisconsin. At the close of Diocesan convention on October 20, 2012, he announced his intention to retire one year hence, on October 31, 2013.

Background 
Jacobus was born in Milwaukee, Wisconsin on 27 September 1944, the youngest of three sons of Lester and Sarah Jacobus. He received his Bachelor of Arts from the University of Wisconsin–Milwaukee in 1967 and his Master of Divinity from Nashotah House Seminary in 1970. Jacobus was ordained Deacon in February 1970 and to the Priesthood in August 1970 by Donald Hathaway Valentine Hallock, VIII Bishop of Milwaukee. Jacobus married Jerrie Ellen Evrard on 25 May 1968; they are the parents of three adult children: Penny, Elizabeth, and David.

He is currently a member of Communion Partners, an Episcopalian group which opposed the 77th General Episcopal Convention's decision to authorize the blessing of same-sex marriages in 2012. The measure to allow the blessing of same-sex unions won by a 111–41 vote with 3 abstentions.

Priesthood 
Jacobus was the Curate at Trinity Church, Wauwatosa, Wisconsin until being called to be Vicar of Grace-Holy Innocents Parish in Hartland, Wisconsin in 1974. One year later, Grace-Holy Innocents became a Parish (changing its name to St. Anskar's), and Jacobus was called as their first Rector, In 1980, he was called by St. Matthias Church, Waukesha, Wisconsin, to be their Rector. He served in this capacity until being elected Bishop.

During his years of ministry, Jacobus has served as member or chair of many Committees and Commissions, both ecclesiastical and secular. These include Standing Committees, Commissions on Ministry, Departments of Congregational Development, as well as the City of Waukesha Equal Opportunity Commission, the Board of the UP Connection, and the Board of the Visiting Nurses Association. He has always been involved in and supportive of Ecumenical ventures, serving on the Anglican/Roman Catholic Dialogue Committee, and assisting the Churches of Greater Waukesha to develop programs of outreach to the needy. In addition, Jacobus was involved in spiritual renewal movements, serving as Spiritual Director for the Cursillo Movement in the Episcopal Diocese of Milwaukee. He was a clergy Deputy to General Convention from the Diocese of Milwaukee for four consecutive Conventions beginning in 1982.

Election as bishop 
Jacobus was consecrated as bishop on 24 May 1994 in the Memorial Chapel at Lawrence University, Appleton, Wisconsin. Edmond L. Browning was the Chief Consecrator. The co-consecrators were William Stevens, VI Bishop of Fond du Lac; Roger J. White, X Bishop of Milwaukee; William Wantland, IV Bishop of Eau Claire; William Hampton Brady, V Bishop of Fond du Lac; Charles Thomas Gaskell, IX Bishop of Milwaukee; and Stanley Atkins, III Bishop of Eau Claire. William Wiedrich, Suffragan Bishop of Chicago, was the preacher.

See also
 List of Succession of Bishops for the Episcopal Church, USA

References

External links
The Diocese of Fond du Lac

1944 births
American Episcopal priests
Episcopalians from Wisconsin
Living people
Nashotah House alumni
University of Wisconsin–Milwaukee alumni
Religious leaders from Milwaukee
American religious leaders
Episcopal bishops of Fond du Lac